Expedition Robinson, was the first season of the Central European version of Survivor which was broadcast on RTL2 in Germany and on ORF in Austria from September 17, 2000 to December 3, 2000. The main twist this season was that the contestants were split into two teams based on their country of origin, with the North team initially being composed of eight Germans and the South team of eight Austrians. The early portion of the competition saw the South team struggle to just survive as they quickly lost the first three immunity challenges leading to the elimination of three of their members. Due to the evacuation of Claudia in episode two and the voluntary exits of Babsi and Lorraine in episodes four and six, jokers Julia, Frank, and Ulrike were added to the North and South teams (Julia and Frank to the North and Ulrike to the South) midway through the pre-merge stage of the competition. When the tribes merged in episode eight, the former members of the South team found themselves the target of a North team based alliance and were systematically picked off until only Ulrike remained. When it came time for the final four, the contestants competed in two challenges in order to determine who would make the final two. As Thomas and Ulrike lost both of said challenges they were eliminated from the game. Ultimately, it was Melanie who won the season over Marc with a jury vote of 4-3.

Finishing order

Voting history

External links
 http://www.big-talk.de/big-talk_alt/ex/exnews.htm
 http://www.big-talk.de/big-talk_alt/ex/exkade01.htm
 http://www.big-talk.de/big-talk_alt/ex/exkaat01.htm

Central European
German reality television series
2000s reality television series
2000s German television series